Reeves Tavern is a historic colonial tavern (now a private residence) in Wayland, Massachusetts.  Built in 1762–63, it is one of the town's best preserved examples of an early tavern.  It was listed on the National Register of Historic Places in 2016.

Description and history
Reeves Tavern is located southeast of Wayland center, in a suburban residential area. The house is a -story wood-frame structure, with a gable roof, two chimneys, clapboarded exterior, and stone foundation. Its front facade is six bays wide, the entrance set in the center-left bay. The interior retains original woodwork and period fireplaces. The barn, located to the left of the house, dates to the 19th century.

The oldest portion of the house is the rightmost pair of bays.  It was probably built sometime before 1720 by Matthew Hussey (or Hasey, spellings vary), with the remainder of the main block added in 1762-63 by Jacob Reeves.  Reeves is documented as operating a tavern on the premises no later than 1764, and was one of the signatories to a 1780 petition to the state for the separation of Wayland from Sudbury.  In 1774, Reeves hosted John Adams.  The property was sold out of the Reeves family in 1906.

See also
National Register of Historic Places listings in Middlesex County, Massachusetts

References

Drinking establishments on the National Register of Historic Places in Massachusetts
Houses on the National Register of Historic Places in Middlesex County, Massachusetts
Taverns in Massachusetts
Buildings and structures in Wayland, Massachusetts
Houses completed in 1763